"Liquor" is a song by American recording artist Chris Brown from his seventh studio album Royalty. It was released as the lead single on June 26, 2015, by RCA Records.

Background and composition
On June 25, 2015, Billboard revealed that Brown's new album will be released in the fall of that year. In the same interview with Billboard, Brown stated that "Liquor" will be included in the album's track list. The song was premiered on June 25 and was released for digital download the next day.

"Liquor" was written by Chris Brown, Tone Stith, Jordan Evans, Matthew Samuels and Omega Shelton, and was produced by Tone Stith and The Aquarius.

Music video
On August 7, 2015, a few images from the music video shoot were released online. On August 27, 2015 Brown uploaded a teaser for "Liquor" on his Instagram. The music video premiered on September 22, 2015, along with "Zero" as one video.

Synopsis
The music video for "Liquor/Zero" was directed by Brown. The “Liquor” part of the video begins with Brown at the bar alone drowning his sorrows, before accepting a drink from a female, that had put a drug in his glass. Brown after drinking that drink starts to feel confused. After that, the girl and Brown take a taxi that takes them to the girl's house, but Brown is under the effect of the drug and sees everything in a psychedelic way. After the night spent with the woman, the "Liquor" part ends with Brown that takes a taxi that takes him to his home.

Chart performance
The song saw moderate success, peaking at number 60 on US Billboard Hot 100 and spending a total of 17 weeks on the chart.

Charts

Certifications

References

External links

2015 singles
2015 songs
Chris Brown songs
RCA Records singles
Songs about alcohol
Songs written by Chris Brown
Songs written by Boi-1da